Wolfgang Trapp (born August 1, 1957) is a German former footballer who became a coach.

Honours
 UEFA Cup winner: 1980.
 DFB-Pokal winner: 1981.

References

1957 births
Living people
German footballers
Eintracht Frankfurt players
SV Darmstadt 98 players
Kickers Offenbach players
Karlsruher SC players
Bundesliga players
2. Bundesliga players
ASV Durlach players
Association football midfielders
UEFA Cup winning players
People from Main-Taunus-Kreis
Sportspeople from Darmstadt (region)
Footballers from Hesse
West German footballers